Awastara is a city populated by the Miskito people located in the department of North Caribbean Coast Autonomous Region in Nicaragua.

The King Pulanka, the traditional feast of the Miskito, originated in Awastara.

References

Further reading 
Philip A Dennis, The Miskito People of Awastara, 2004. .

Populated places in Nicaragua
North Caribbean Coast Autonomous Region